Arthur Edward Greenup (11 July 1902 – 3 August 1980) was a trade unionist and politician in New South Wales, Australia.

Early life
Born in Sydney, he became a shop assistant at the age of 14. He was an organiser and eventually the President of the Shop Assistants' Union.

Political career
In 1938 he was elected an alderman for the Municipality of Newtown, serving until the council was abolished in 1948. He served as Mayor of Newtown for 2 years, from December 1941 until December 1943.  Under the Local Government (Areas) Act 1948, Newtown became a ward of Sydney City Council and Greenup was elected one of four aldermen, serving until 1 December 1950.

In June 1950 he was elected to the New South Wales Legislative Assembly as the member for Newtown-Annandale, representing the Labor Party. He defeated the sitting Lang Labor member for Newtown, Lilian Fowler.

The district of Newtown-Annandale was abolished as a result of the 1952 redistribution, and Greenup was defeated in the preselection contest for Marrickville. Greenup transferred to federal politics as the Labor candidate for the House of Representatives seat of Dalley, located in the inner suburbs of Sydney, including Balmain, Glebe and Leichhardt. Greenup was successful at the by-election on 9 May 1953, but only held the seat until 1955, when he again lost Labor preselection.

Later life and death
Greenup worked for the shop assistants division of the Australian Workers Union, initially as an organiser and as vice president of the division from 1973 until 1977.

References

 

Australian Labor Party members of the Parliament of Australia
Members of the Australian House of Representatives for Dalley
Members of the Australian House of Representatives
Members of the New South Wales Legislative Assembly
Mayors of Newtown
1902 births
1980 deaths
20th-century Australian politicians